Kuteb or Kutep may refer to:
 Kuteb people, an ethnolinguistic grope of Nigeria and Cameroon
 Kuteb language, the language spoken by them